The 2011 World Taekwondo Olympic Qualification Tournament for the London Olympic Games was held at the Sarhadchi Olympic Center in Baku, Azerbaijan from June 30 to July 3, 2011. Each country may enter maximum 2 male and 2 female divisions with only one in each division and the first three ranked athletes per weight division qualify their NOCs a place each for Olympic
Games. Total twenty four athletes qualify their NOCs a place each for Olympic Games through WTF World Qualification Tournament. A total of 332 athletes, 186 males and 146 females, from 108 nations took part in the tournament.

Medalists

Men

Women

Qualification summary

References

External links
 World Taekwondo Federation

 
Olympic Qualification
Taekwondo Olympic Qual
Taekwondo Olympic Qual
World